Ali Ewoldt (born October 6, 1982) is a Filipino-American theatre actress, who made her Broadway debut in the Les Misérables revival in 2006, playing Cosette. She has also performed on national and international tours and in U.S. regional theatre. She became well known as the first Asian-American actress to star as Christine Daaé in The Phantom of the Opera on Broadway.

Life and career
Ewoldt was born in Chicago to a Filipina mother and a Euro-American father and raised in Pleasantville, New York. After performing as a child in a nearby regional theater and in musical theatre in high school, she went on to graduate cum laude from Yale University.

Ewoldt performed the role of Princess Jasmine in Disneyland, and she also worked at the Tokyo Disney theme park before appearing in a U.S. tour of Les Misérables. She began the tour as a member of the ensemble, and later understudied the role of Cosette, before she finally received the role during the tour. She then played Cosette in the Les Misérables Broadway revival in 2006.

From 2009 to 2011, Ewoldt starred in North American tour and in the 50th anniversary international tour of West Side Story. In 2015, she played Tuptim in a tour of The King and I, where she "received the loudest applause from the audience after she sang her stirring, operatic interpretation of 'My Lord and Master' ". Other regional theatre roles include Luisa in The Fantasticks at the Mt. Washington Valley Theatre Co.

In 2015, she appeared in The King and I revival on Broadway.

On June 13, 2016, she joined the Broadway company of The Phantom of the Opera as the show's first Asian-American Christine.

Ewoldt sang the role of Briella (Dorabella) in Salastina's world premiere of Vid Guerrerio's production of OC Fan Tutte for Salastina in Los Angeles, an updated English-language version of Mozart's 1790 opera Così fan tutte.

Performance credits

See also
 Filipinos in the New York metropolitan area

References

External links

1982 births
Living people
Actors from Park Ridge, Illinois
People from Pleasantville, New York
21st-century American actresses
American musical theatre actresses
Actresses from New York (state)
American actresses of Filipino descent
Yale University alumni